The Iowa Hawkeyes swimming and diving team represents the University of Iowa in NCAA men's and women's swimming and diving.  The teams compete at Campus Recreation and Wellness Center in Iowa City. Marc Long is the head coach of both the men's and women's swimming teams. Todd Waikel is the head diving coach.

History

Facilities

The Iowa Swimming and Diving program competes in Campus Recreation and Wellness Center located on the east side of the Iowa campus.

Year-By-Year

Notable former team members
Graeme Brewer  

Wally Ris  

Bowen Strassforth  

Rafal Szukala  

Artur Wojdat

References